The 2005–06 Real Zaragoza season was Real Zaragoza's third consecutive season in top-division of the Spanish football league, the La Liga, and the 74th as a football club.

Pre-season and friendlies

Competitions

Overview

La Liga

League table

Results summary

Results by round

Matches

Copa del Rey

References 

Real Zaragoza seasons
Real Zaragoza